Gale Bruno van Albada (28 March 1912, Amsterdam – 18 December 1972, Amsterdam) was a Dutch astronomer, known for his orbital observations of binary stars and studies on the evolution of galaxy clusters.

Biography 

Van Albada obtained his Ph.D. with Antonie Pannekoek at the University of Amsterdam in 1945. He shared Pannekoek's communist ideologies and back in the 1930s his brother Piet van Albada had been an associate of Marinus van der Lubbe.

Van Albada was director of the Bosscha Observatory on Java from May 1949 to July 1958. On August 1, 1950 he married the astronomer Dr. Elsa van Dien (Paramaribo, 12 July 1914 - Amsterdam, 15 October 2007) who was working at the Bosscha Observatory at the time. The couple had three children, one of whom became an astronomer.

Because of the political situation the family had to leave Java in July 1958. In 1960, Van Albada succeeded Herman Zanstra as head of the department of astronomy at the University of Amsterdam.

In 1951 Van Albada became member of the Royal Netherlands Academy of Arts and Sciences, he resigned in 1958.

Honors 

The lunar crater van Albada and the main-belt asteroid 2019 van Albada are named after him.

References

Further reading 
 Anon. (1973). "Dutch Stellar Astronomer." Sky & Telescope 45, no. 3: 160.
 Oort, J. H. (1973). "In memoriam Prof. Dr G. van Albada, 28 March 1912–18 December 1972." Hemel en Dampkring 71: 47–48. ADS
van Albada, G. B. (1958). "Photographic Measures of Double Stars from Plates Obtained with the 60 cm Refractor." Annals of the Bosscha Observatory Lembang 9, pt. 2. ADS
 (1962). "Distribution of Galaxies in Space." In Problems of Extra-galactic Research:I.A.U. Symposium No. 15,August 10–12, 1961, edited by G. C. McVittie, pp. 411–428. New York: Macmillan.
 (1962). "Gravitational Evolution of Clusters of Galaxies, with Consideration of the Complete Velocity Distribution." Bulletin of the Astronomical Institutes of the Netherlands 16: 172–177. ADS
 (1963). "Simple Expressions for Observable Quantities in Some World Models." Bulletin of the Astronomical Institutes of the Netherlands 17: 127–131. ADS

1912 births
1972 deaths
20th-century Dutch astronomers
Members of the Royal Netherlands Academy of Arts and Sciences
Scientists from Amsterdam
University of Amsterdam alumni
Academic staff of the University of Amsterdam